In Ireland Counties are divided into civil parishes and parishes are further divided into townlands. The following is a list of civil parishes in County Antrim, Northern Ireland:

 

A
Aghagallon, Aghalee, Ahoghill, Antrim, Ardclinis, Armoy

B
Ballinderry, Ballintoy, Ballyclug, Ballycor, Ballylinny, Ballymartin, Ballymoney, Ballynure, Ballyrashane, Ballyscullion, Ballywillin, Billy, Blaris, Braid

C
Camlin, Carncastle, Carnmoney, Carrickfergus or St. Nicholas', Connor, Craigs, Cranfield, Culfeightrin

D
Derriaghy, Derrykeighan, Donegore, Drumbeg, Drummaul, Dunaghy, Duneane, Dunluce

F
Finvoy

G
Glenavy, Glenwhirry, Glynn, Grange of Doagh, Grange of Drumtullagh, Grange of Dundermot, Grange of Inispollan, Grange of Killyglen, Grange of Layd, Grange of Muckamore, Grange of Nilteen, Grange of Scullion, Grange of Shilvodan

I
Inver, Island Magee

K
Kilbride, Kildollagh, Killagan, Killead, Kilraghts, Kilroot, Kilwaughter, Kirkinriola

L
Lambeg, Larne, Layd, Loughguile

M
Magheragall, Magheramesk

N
Newtown Crommelin

P
Portglenone

R
Racavan, Raloo, Ramoan, Rasharkin, Rashee, Rathlin Island

S
Shankill, Skerry

T
Templecorran, Templepatrick, Tickmacrevan, Tullyrusk

See also
List of townlands in County Antrim

References

 
Antrim
Civil parishes